Tachina agnita is a species of fly in the genus Tachina of the family Tachinidae that is endemic to Belgium.

References

Insects described in 1838
Diptera of Europe
Endemic fauna of Belgium
agnita